Léonie Sazias (27 July 1957 – 3 October 2022) was a Dutch politician. A member of the 50PLUS party, she served in the House of Representatives from 2017 to 2021.

In the 1980s, Sazias was a presenter for the programme TopPop, where she interviewed acts such as Toto, The Bangles, Alison Moyet, Robert Smith, and Demis Roussos.

Sazias died of colon cancer on 3 October 2022, at the age of 65.

References

1957 births
2022 deaths 
Deaths from colorectal cancer
21st-century Dutch politicians
21st-century Dutch women politicians
Members of the House of Representatives (Netherlands)
Dutch television personalities
50PLUS politicians
Politicians from Rotterdam